Rattanawapi is a district (amphoe) of Nong Khai province, northeastern Thailand.

Geography
Neighboring districts are (from the east clockwise): Pak Khat and So Phisai of Bueng Kan province; Fao Rai and Phon Phisai of Nong Khai Province; and Bolikhamxai Province of Laos.

History
The minor district (king amphoe) was split off from Phon Phisai district on 1 April 1995.

On 15 May 2007, all 81 minor districts were upgraded to full districts. On 24 August the upgrade became official.

Administration
The district is divided into five sub-districts (tambons), which are further subdivided into 61 villages (mubans). There are no municipal (thesaban) areas. There are five tambon administrative organizations (TAO).

References

External links
amphoe.com

Rattanawapi